The Economic Community of West African States (ECOWAS) was created by the Treaty of Lagos on May 28, 1975, in Lagos, Lagos State, Nigeria. ECOWAS was established to promote cooperation and integration in order to create an economic and monetary union for promoting economic growth and development in West Africa.

State parties

 – suspended from Community after 2008 coup d'état
 – suspended from Community after 2009 auto-coup
 - suspended from Community after 2010 elections

Notes

1975 in Nigeria
20th century in Lagos
Economic Community of West African States
Treaties concluded in 1975
Treaties of Burkina Faso
Treaties of Cape Verde
Treaties of Ghana
Treaties of Guinea
Treaties of Guinea-Bissau
Treaties of Ivory Coast
Treaties of Liberia
Treaties of Mali
Treaties of Niger
Treaties of Nigeria
Treaties of Senegal
Treaties of Sierra Leone
Treaties of the Gambia
Treaties of the Republic of Dahomey
Treaties of Togo